ADJ or Adj may refer to:

 Abbreviation for adjustment, adjoining, or adjacent
 Adjective, a part of speech
 Adjukru language, ISO-639-3 code
Amman Civil Airport in East Amman, Jordan (IATA code ADJ)
 Adjugate (or classical adjoint) of a matrix in mathematics
AdJ, software

See also
 
 

 AD (disambiguation)
 DJ (disambiguation)